The Czech Republic has participated in all Summer and Winter Universiades since the dissolution of Czechoslovakia in 1993.

Medal count

Summer Universiade 
The Czech Republic has won 90 medals in 14 appearances at the Summer Universiade between 1993 and 2019.

Winter Universiade 
The Czech Republic has won 99 medals in 13 appearances at the Winter Universiades between 1993 and 2023.

See also 
 Czechoslovakia at the Universiade
 Czech Republic at the Olympics
 Czech Republic at the Paralympics
 Czech Republic at the European Games

External links 
 FISU History at the FISU

 
Nations at the Universiade
Student sport in the Czech Republic